Le Grand-Pressigny is a commune in the Indre-et-Loire department in central France.

There is a Chalcolithic flint mine located in the commune. It produced an unusual caramel-coloured stone which appears to have been highly prized across Europe with examples found in the Pyrenees, the Netherlands and Switzerland. Blocks of flint and unfinished blanks were traded, as well as finished tools.

Population

See also
 Grimes Graves
 Tony Tebby
 Le Petit-Pressigny
Communes of the Indre-et-Loire department

References

Communes of Indre-et-Loire
Lithics
Surface mines in France
Archaeological sites in France